Stapley is a surname. Notable people with the surname include:

Anthony Stapley (1590–1655), one of the regicides of King Charles I of England
Charles Stapley (1925–2011), British actor
Delbert L. Stapley (1896–1978), member of the Quorum of the Twelve Apostles in The Church of Jesus Christ of Latter-day Saints
Harry Stapley (1883–1937), English footballer
Jay Stapley, British musician
John Stapley (1628–1701), Royalist who plotted with others to overthrow Oliver Cromwell and restore Charles II of England to the throne
Jonathan A. Stapley, chemist, executive at a startup firm, independent historian of Mormonism
Richard Stapley, stage name Richard Wyler, (1923–2010), British-born American actor and writer
William Stapley (1887–1964), English footballer

See also
Stapeley
Staveley (disambiguation)
Stopsley